David Zec (born 5 January 2000) is a Slovenian professional footballer who plays as a centre-back for Slovenian club Celje.

Honours
Triglav Kranj
Slovenian Second League: 2016–17

References

External links

2000 births
Living people
Sportspeople from Kranj
Slovenian footballers
Slovenian expatriate footballers
Association football defenders
Slovenia youth international footballers
Slovenia under-21 international footballers
Slovenian Second League players
Slovenian PrvaLiga players
Liga Portugal 2 players
Ukrainian Premier League players
NK Triglav Kranj players
S.L. Benfica B players
FC Rukh Lviv players
NK Celje players
Slovenian expatriate sportspeople in Portugal
Slovenian expatriate sportspeople in Ukraine
Expatriate footballers in Portugal
Expatriate footballers in Ukraine